John Pisto, also known as Chef John Pisto, (born January 20, 1940) is an American culinary arts chef and host of Monterey's Cooking, a daily program which is aired five times a week on the AmericanLife (ALN) Network as well as the Comcast Cable Network. He is also the proprietor and owner of The Whaling Station, a noted prime steak restaurant located in Monterey County.

Personal
Pisto and his wife, both grandparents, reside in Monterey.

References

External links
Chef John Pisto at MySpace

American television chefs
American male chefs
American people of Italian descent
Businesspeople from California
People from Monterey, California
Television personalities from California
1940 births
Living people